Lygodactylus tuberosus is a species of gecko endemic to southwestern Madagascar.

References

Lygodactylus
Reptiles described in 1965
Reptiles of Madagascar
Endemic fauna of Madagascar
Taxa named by Robert Mertens